The 1900–01 French Rugby Union Championship of first division was won by Stade Français by defeating SBUC in the final.

Stade Français was declared French Champion after Stade Bordelais refused to replay the final  following a protest lodged by their opponent. Stade Français contested that, after the merging of Stade Bordelais and Bordeaux U.C., three player of the second of them, had not waited three months before playing for their new team. The federation (USFSA) annulled the match and decided to repeat the match in Paris.

Qualification Round 
France was divided into 3 regions, the winner of the Seine region, was directly qualified to contest the final. Stade Français had won that final against Le Havre AC (21–0).

Stade Bordelais had defeated F.C. Lyon (11–4) winner of the Rhone region  championship, after winning the Garonne region championship.

Final

Notes

External links
Compte rendu de la finale de 1901, sur lnr.fr

1901
France
Championship